The Patiala Municipal Corporation is a nagar nigam (municipal corporation) which administers the city of Patiala, Punjab. It has 60 members elected with a first-past-the-post voting system and 3 ex-officio members which are MLAs for Patiala, Patiala Rural, and Sanour. The corporation was founded on 24 September 1997, and the first elections were held in June 2002.

Mayor
The Mayor of Patiala is the elected chief of the Municipal Corporation of Patiala. The mayor is the first citizen of the city. The role is largely ceremonial as the real powers are vested in the Municipal Commissioner. The mayor plays a decorative role of representing and upholding the dignity of the city and a functional role in deliberating over the discussions in the Corporation.

Deputy Mayors
Senior Deputy Mayor

Junior Deputy Mayor

Elections

References 

Municipal corporations in Punjab, India